The New Caledonia buttonquail (Turnix novaecaledoniae) is a species of bird in the family Turnicidae.
It is endemic to New Caledonia. It previously was considered a subspecies of the painted buttonquail.

Its natural habitats are dry savanna, subtropical or tropical dry shrubland, and subtropical or tropical dry lowland grassland.

References

Birds of New Caledonia
Turnix
Birds described in 1889
Taxa named by William Robert Ogilvie-Grant